Queenan is a surname of Irish origin. Notable people with the surname include:

Brooke Queenan (born 1984), American basketball player
Daren Queenan (born 1966), American basketball player
Joe Queenan (born 1950), American journalist and writer
Oliver Queenan, fictional character

References

Surnames of Irish origin